Snowicane may refer to:
 1804 New England hurricane
 February 25–27, 2010 North American blizzard
 2011 Bering Sea superstorm